is Japanese pop rock band Ikimono-gakari's first greatest hits album. It was released on 3 November 2010 by Sony Music Entertainment Japan. The album features 31 previously released tracks and three new songs: "Ima Hashiridaseba", "Spirits", and "Kaze to Mirai".

It was released in two versions: a regular 2CD edition and a limited 2CD+DVD edition. The first press regular edition contains an ikimono-card 021. The limited edition contains a double-sided ikimono-land/member poster, an ikimono-land card, an ikimono-land sticker, two ikimono-land postcards, ikimono-card 021, and an application card to enter a lottery for ikimono-gakari goods. The bonus DVD contains a 115-minute documentary, "ikiiki TV", featuring member commentary on all the songs.

The album was certified 'Million' by the Recording Industry Association of Japan for shipment of one million copies. To commemorate this achievement, a limited 2CD winter jacket edition was shipped out between December 17, 2010 and January 2011.

Track listing

Charts

 Total reported sales: 1,198,523
 Total sales in 2010: 906,756 (2010 Oricon Top 100 Albums - #2 album of the year)
 Total sales in 2011: 292,767

References

External links
 Oricon Profile: Limited Edition | Regular Edition
 Sony Music Profile: Limited Edition | Regular Edition

2010 albums
Ikimono-gakari albums